The People's Party, known in Thai as Khana Ratsadon, was a Siamese group of military and civil officers, and later a political party, which staged a bloodless revolution against King Prajadhipok's government and transformed the country's absolute monarchy to constitutional monarchy on 24 June 1932.

Background

The Promoters
In 1927, the Kingdom of Siam, the Rattanakosin Kingdom (1782–1932), was under the absolutist rule of the House of Chakri, under King Prajadhipok, Rama VII. Under his reign, the nation experienced troubles stemming from an archaic government confronted with serious economic problems and threats from abroad, the British and French Empires. The country was also experiencing a dramatic social change as the urban and middle classes of Bangkok were starting to grow, slowly demanding more rights from their government, criticizing it as ineffective. These changes were mostly led by men, civilians and military, who had graduated or travelled abroad. They wanted to transform Siam into a modern country along the lines of a Western democracy.

In February 1927, a group of seven Siamese students, later known as the "promoters", met at a hotel on the Rue Du Sommerard in Paris and founded what would become the People's Party. For five days they met and proposed arguments for and against various aspects of the movement, the men were:

1. Lieutenant Prayoon Pamornmontri, Army officer, formerly of King Vajiravudh's Royal Guards
2. Lieutenant Plaek Khittasangkha, later Luang Phibulsonggram, Army officer, student, School of Applied Artillery, France
3. Lieutenant Thatsanai Mitphakdi, Army officer, student, French Cavalry Academy
4. Tua Lophanukrom, scientist studying in Switzerland
5. Luang Siriratchamaitri, diplomat, officer at the Siamese Embassy in Paris
6. Naep Phahonyothin, law student studying in England
7. Pridi Banomyong, law student studying at the Institut d'Études Politiques de Paris

Six principles 

The revolutionaries made Pridi Panomyong their president and termed themselves the "promoters". The party determined a sixfold objective which was later called the "Six Principles", as follows:

1. To maintain the supreme power of the Thai people.
2. To maintain national security.
3. To maintain the economic welfare of the Thai people in accordance with the National Economic Project.
4. To protect the equality of the Thai people.
5. To maintain the people's rights and liberties, insofar as they are not inconsistent with any of the above-mentioned principles.
6. To provide public education for all citizens.

To achieve these goals, the party determined that they must overthrow, using force if necessary, the present government and the system of absolute monarchy and turn the Asian kingdom into a modern constitutional monarchy. Most of the members  were students educated abroad, mostly in the United Kingdom and France.

When the group returned to Siam, they enlisted members from among the army and navy, the merchant class, civil servants and others. Their membership eventually reached 102, separated into four main branches. These included the civilians, led by Pridi Banomyong; the navy, led by Luang Sinthusongkhramchai; the junior army officers, led by Major Phibulsonggram; and finally the senior officers, led by Colonel Phot Phahonyothin.

Legacy 
The party was eventually successful in their goal of revolution by bloodless coup. By 1933 they had turned Siam into a single party state. However the party itself was short-lived, due to infighting as the party had too many factions, conflicting interests, and political beliefs. The party eventually divided into two factions, a civilian faction led by Pridi Bhanomyong, and a military faction led by Marshal Pibulsongkram.

They would dominate Thai politics for the next two decades, producing six Prime Ministers of Thailand from their ranks. The party declined at about the time the Second World War ended.

As the party lost power, subsequent governments attempted to downplay their significance and erase their legacy. Part of this was accomplished through the removal of architecture associated with the party, most significantly beginning with the demolition of Sala Chaloem Thai in 1989. This movement intensified in the 2010s; the Supreme Court building controversially demolished in 2013, and following the 2014 coup, multiple landmarks became quietly removed without explanation. On the 88th anniversary of the revolution in 2020, the Reuters news service identified six historical markers memorialising the People's Party and the events of 1932 which have been removed or renamed over the previous year. In most cases it is not known who is responsible. Some historians, such as Chatri Prakitnonthakan of Silpakorn University, interpreted these removals as an attempted "ideological cleansing" by the conservative establishment.

A memorial plaque honoring the 1932 Revolution was reported missing on 14 April 2017. It was thought to be stolen on 5 April and was replaced with another plaque with text praising the Chakri Dynasty. , no one has taken responsibility for the theft. The 1932 Revolution brass plaque, about 30 centimeters across, was embedded in the asphalt of the Royal Plaza, less than 10 meters from the equestrian statue depicting King Rama V. The site is where the revolt took place on 24 June 1932. Here, a declaration condemning absolute monarchy was read. Press reports noted that ultraroyalist groups had threatened to remove the plaque in the months preceding its theft.

A Royal Thai Army artillery base in Lopburi Province bore the name of General Phraya Phahon until 2019 when, at the order of the current king, Vajiralongkorn, it was renamed King Bhumibol base. Long-standing statues of Phraya Phahon and Field Marshal Plaek Phibunsongkhram installed at the base are to be removed and replaced by a statue of King Bhumibol.

Public perception and discourse over the party's legacy has also fluctuated over time. Their role in establishing a constitutional monarchy was glossed over by school textbooks, and rhetoric dismissing the party's actions as premature was popularized. Such ideas were reignited in the 2010s, as ideological conflicts over democracy and the monarchy intensified. Conservative writers demonized the People's Party as republicans. This led to a reactionary response by liberal groups. During the 2020 protests, youth protesters symbolically installed a new plaque in Sanam Luang, and a group leading the protest movement called themselves "Khana Ratsadon 2563" (People's Party 2020).

Members 
The members of the People's Party were a mix of both military officers and civilians. Lieutenant Krachang Tularak was its last surviving member. He died on 24 June 2009 at the age of 98.

Military faction

Army faction

 Colonel Phahon Phonphayuhasena (Phot Phahonyothin), the Head of the military faction and leader of Khana Ratsadon
 Phraya Songsuradet (Deva Bandhumasena)
 Phraya Ritthiakhaney (Sala Emasiri)
 Phra Phrasasphithayayut (Wan Choothin)
 Major Luang Phibulsonggram (Plaek Khittasangkha)
 Captain Luang Chamnanyutthasin (Choei Rayanan)
 Captain Luang Katsongkhram (Thian Kengradomying)
 Captain Luang Kriangsakphichit (Khuan Chittakhun)
 Captain Luang Chansongkhram (Phan Chalichan)
 Captain Luang Chawengsaksongkhram (Chuang Khwanchoet)
 Captain Luang Thatsanainiyomsuek (Thatsanai Mittraphakdi)
 Captain Luang Phromyothi (Mangkon Phonchiwin)
 Captain Luang Ronnasitthiphichai (Chuea Kanchanaphinthu)
 Captain Luang Sawatronnarong (Sawat Darasawat)
 Captain Luang Seriroengrit (Charun Rattanakun)
 Captain Luang Aduldejcharat (Bat Phuengphrakhun)
 Lieutenant Khun Sucharitronnakan (Phong Nakhanut)
 Lieutenant Khun Chamnongphummiwet (Chamnong Siwaphaet)
 Lieutenant Khun Nirandonchai (Sawek Nilanchai)
 Lieutenant Khun Phiphatsorakan (Theng Phatthanasiri)
 Lieutenant Khun Plotporapak (Plot Phanusawa)
 Lieutenant Khun Rueangwirayut (Bunrueang Wirahong)
 Lieutenant Khun Wimonsorakit (Wimon Kengrian)
 Lieutenant Khun Sisarakon (Chalo Sithanakon)
 Lieutenant Chai Prathipasen
 Lieutenant Thuan Wichaikhatthakha
 Lieutenant Nom Ketunuti
 Minor Lieutenant Charun Chittralak
 Minor Lieutenant Saman Thephatsadin Na Ayutthaya
 Minor Lieutenant Udom Phutthikasetarin
 Major Luang Wichakkonlayut (Sian Susin)

Navy faction

 Group Commander Luang Sinthusongkhramchai (Sin Kamalanavin)
 Lieutenant Commander Luang Supachalasai (Bung Supachalasai)
 Senior Lieutenant Luang Thamrongnawasawat (Thawan Tharisawat)
 Senior Lieutenant Luang Sangworayutthakit (Sangson Suwannachip)
 Senior Lieutenant Luang Nithetkonlakit (Klang Rotchanasena)
 Senior Lieutenant Luang Nawawichit (Phan Amphaiwan)
 Senior Lieutenant Sa-nguan Ruchirapha
 Senior Lieutenant Sa-ngop Charunphon
 Senior Lieutenant Chalit Kunkamthon
 Junior Lieutenant Thonglo Khamhiran
 Junior Lieutenant Chip Siriphaibun
 Junior Lieutenant Prasoet Suksamai
 Junior Lieutenant Wan Ruyuphon
 Ensign Chan Ratsamithat
 Ensign Thongdi Ra-ngapphai
 Chamrat Suwannachip

Civil faction

 Luang Praditmanutham (Pridi Phanomyong), the head of the civil faction and vice leader of Khana Ratsadon
 Luang Sirirajmaitree (Charun Singhaseni)
 Luang Kowit-aphaiwong (Khuang Aphaiwong)
 Luang Naruebetmanit (Sa-nguan Chuthatemi)
 Luang Chamnanitikaset (Uthai Saengmani)
 Luang Atthasanraprasit (Thongyen Lilamia)
 Luang Atthakitikamchon (Klueng Phahomyonh)
 Luang Sunthonthephatsadin (Saphrang Thephatsadin Na Ayutthaya)
 Luang Dechatiwongwarawat (M.L. Kri Dechatiwong)
 Tua Laphanukrom
 Prachuap Bunnak
 M.L. Udom Sanitwong
 Naep Phahonlayothin
 Thawee Boonyaket
 Junior Lieutenant Prayoon Pamornmontri
 Wilat Osathanon
 Charun Suepsaeng
 Leng Sisonwong
 Direk Jayanama
 Wichian Suwannathat
 Chun Pinthanon
 Sawat Sotthithat
 Chittasen Pancha
 Yong Phonlabun
 Ek Supphapodok
 Surin Chinothai
 Siri Chatinan
 Chaliao Pathummarot
 Banchong Sicharun
 Prasoet Sicharun
 Chaeng Muttafa
 Karim Sicharun
 Sa-nguan Tularak
 Sim Wirawaithaya
 Nguan Thongprasoet
 Pramot Phuengsunthon
 Charoen Pantharo
 Thongpleo Chonlaphum
 Phadoem Angsuwat
 Chup Salayachiwin
 Klin Thephatsadin Na Ayutthaya
 Son Bunchung
 Yon Samananon
 Yin Samananon
 Police Lieutenant Choei Kalanchai
 Police Lieutenant Thiang Chaloemsak

See also

 Siamese coup d'état of 1932
 Siamese coup d'état of 1933
 History of Thailand (1932-1973)
 Prajadhipok
 List of prime ministers of Thailand

References

Bibliography

Further reading
 Sombat Thamrongthanyawong. (2006) Kan mueang kan pok khrong thai phoso 1762-2500 (Fourth publication). Bangkok: Sematham Publishing House.

External links

Political history of Thailand
Defunct political parties in Thailand
Thai democracy movements
Political parties established in 1927
1927 establishments in Siam
Siamese revolution of 1932